Clear Lake High School is a rural public high school in the Clear Lake Community School District. It is within the city of Clear Lake, Iowa. It is located in Cerro Gordo County.  The school colors are black and gold and the mascot is a lion.

Extracurricular activities
Model United Nations
Mock Trial
Speech Contest
National Honor Society
Jazz Band
Dance Team

Athletics
The Lions compete in the North Iowa Cedar League Conference in the following sports:
Fall:
Cross Country
Cheerleading
Football
 2000 Class 3A State Champions
Volleyball
Dance Team
Winter:
Wrestling
Basketball
Cheerleading
Dance Team
Spring:
Golf
 Boys' 6-time Class 3A State Champions (1993, 1998, 2004, 2005, 2006, 2011)
 Girls' 2-time Class 3A State Champions (2010, 2012)
 Coed 3-time Class 1A State Champions (2009, 2010, 2013)
Soccer
Tennis
Track & Field
Dance Team
Summer:
Baseball
 3-time State Champions (2013, 2015, 2016) 
Softball

See also
List of high schools in Iowa

References

External links
Clear Lake Community Schools Webpage

Public high schools in Iowa
Schools in Cerro Gordo County, Iowa
Clear Lake, Iowa